Mount Eos is a mountain with a bare summit rising to about ,  north of Mount Adam in the Admiralty Mountains of Victoria Land, Antarctica. It was visited in 1981–82 by Bradley Field, a geologist with the New Zealand Geological Survey, who suggested the name because the area provided excellent views of dawns and sunsets; in Greek mythology, Eos is the goddess of the dawn, whose Roman equivalent is Aurora. This topographical feature lies situated on the Pennell Coast, a portion of Antarctica lying between Cape Williams and Cape Adare.

References 

Mountains of Victoria Land
Pennell Coast
Eos